Fritz is both a surname and a given name.

Fritz may also refer to:

Places
Fritz, Kentucky, an unincorporated community within Magoffin County, Kentucky, United States
A Pedra do Fritz, a high peak in the Serra dos Aimorés mountains in Brazil

Business
Fritz-chip, secure cryptoprocessor of the Trusted Computing Group
"Fritz" helmet, nickname for the Personnel Armor System for Ground Troops kevlar helmet currently used by the US Military
Fritz, alternate name for Devon sausage
Fritz handle, cane handle developed by a German count to make cane use by the arthritic sufferer more comfortable
Fritz Industries, manufacturing company based in Dallas, Texas
Fritz Tile, also spelled Fritztile, brand of resilient terrazzo floor tile
Fritz (radio station), a German radio station

Others
Fritz (chess), a computer chess program
Fritz, a short story by Satyajit Ray
Nickname to the German given name Friedrich
Alias of Friedrich Oskar Giesel
Walter "Fritz" Mondale, former Vice President of the United States

See also
Fritz X, a guided bomb, developed during World War II
"On the fritz", phrase meaning an appliance is broken or malfunctioning (imitating the sound of electric sparks)
Frit, a ceramic composition